Bucculatrix nigricomella is a species of moth of the family Bucculatricidae. It was first described in 1839 by Philipp Christoph Zeller. It is found in most of Europe (except the Balkan Peninsula). 

The wingspan is 7–8 mm. The head is dark fuscous. Antennal eyecaps whitish, forewings shining greyish-bronzy, pairs of costal and dorsal undefined ochreous whitish spots before middle and at 2/3. Hindwings are rather dark grey. The larva is greenish or yellowish; head pale brown; segment 2. On the Continent ([Europe]) the usual form of the imago is almost unicolorous, the spots being nearly or quite obsolete, but this form does not seem to have occurred in England.

Adults are on wing from April to May and again in August. There are two generations per year.

The larvae feed on Leucanthemum vulgare. They mine the leaves of their host plant. The mine consists of a long, hair thin, winding corridor. Usually the corridor is mostly on the upper-surface. The frass is initially deposited in a narrow continuous central line. Further on, the frass line is often interrupted. Older larvae live free and cause window feeding, usually at the leaf underside.

References

External links
 
 bladmineerders.nl
 UKmoths

Bucculatricidae
Leaf miners
Moths described in 1839
Moths of Europe
Taxa named by Philipp Christoph Zeller